Rory O'Brien (born 28 June 1986) is an Australian rules footballer currently playing for the Peel Thunder Football Club in the West Australian Football League (WAFL). He is the older brother of Brock O'Brien.

O'Brien made his league debut for Peel Thunder in round 1 of the 2005 season and was voted the club's best and fairest player in 2006. He spent the 2008 season at North Adelaide Football Club in the South Australian National Football League, before returning to Peel Thunder in 2009. After winning Peel's best and fairest award for a second time in 2010, he transferred to East Fremantle for the 2011 season. 2011 also saw O'Brien make his state debut for Western Australia.

During his time at East Fremantle, O'Brien has been awarded the Lynn Medal for the club's best and fairest on three occasions; in 2011 and 2014 he was the sole winner, while he shared the award with Andrew Stephen in 2013. In 2013, O'Brien won the Sandover Medal for the best and fairest player in the WAFL with 55 votes.

After five years and 105 games with East Fremantle, O'Brien returned to his original club Peel Thunder for the 2016 season.

References

External links
WAFL playing statistics

Living people
1986 births
Peel Thunder Football Club players
North Adelaide Football Club players
East Fremantle Football Club players
Australian rules footballers from Western Australia
Sandover Medal winners